The Shagreen Bone Op. 37-38 (1990) is a full-length ballet in three acts and an opera entr'acte in one act by Yuri Khanon, to a libretto by the composer based on Balzac's 1831 novel The Shagreen Skin.

Background 
The ballet (Op.37) and the entr'acte (Op.38) were written in 1990 on commission from the Mikhaylovsky Theatre in Leningrad. The libretto is based entirely on the dialogues between the two characters – Pauline and Raphael.

In 1992, an avant-garde film-opera The Shagreen Bone was shot at the Saint Petersburg Documentary Film Studio, with Yuri Khanon in the main role. The soundtrack contained the entr'acte and some of his other works: The Song about Death No.1 and Mechanics of Thought Movement (from the cycle Public Songs, Op. 34). The film choreographer and scenographer was Andrey Bosov, the leader of the youth group of the Kirov Ballet.

The Shagreen Bone is written in the genre of "tendentious classical ballet" or "ballet with comments." Paradoxically, it was Ludwig Minkus's Don Quixote and Eric Satie's Parade which served as reference for the composer.

When working on the ballet libretto Khanon noticed how "hastily and carelessly this novel was written." Throughout the text one feels how Balzac was in a hurry to finish on time. Under the pressure of his creditors, he worked himself to the point of exhaustion.

As composer and librettist in one, Khanon created a complete spectacle, a compressed version, a sort of extract of the formal ballet language. His aim was to stage not only a ballet but a "ballet about ballet." The Shagreen Bone was defined by the author as a rearguard ballet. This is a reference to the past, while keeping the odor of the present.

A question that often arises is how has it happened that the "Wild Ass's Skin" turned into a "Bone"? One can answer like this, for example: how many years have passed "since then"? Anything that does not decompose ossifies and then petrifies. In the novel Vanière, the gardener of monsieur Raphael de Valanten, examines with surprise a shagreen he found in a well and says: "dry as wood and not greasy at all." Thus, the work illustrates the idea of ossification of any culture, including classical ballet.

The Shagreen Bone is somehow the "reset" (rejection) of the culture of ballet. Subjected to the laws of ballet and summarizing the results of its development, the work demonstrates the absurdity of ballet and its stagnant forms. The composer seems to rise from the orchestra pit and throw bones in the face of the audience, that is to say, ballet clichés: grand pas, fouettés, variations, adagios. Yet the result is a beautiful romantic ballet, showed twice: firstly the ballet as such, with its meaningless joy and conventional character, and secondly with the author's attitude. This was one of the reasons, among others, for changing the title and replacing the "skin" with a "bone."

References

1990 compositions
Compositions for symphony orchestra
1992 ballet premieres
Ballets premiered in Saint Petersburg
Compositions by Yuri Khanon
Works based on French novels
Adaptations of works by Honoré de Balzac